Hwang Jung-woon (born 10 April 1986) is a South Korean badminton player. Hwang who came from Suncheon, graduated from the Dong-a University, and later joined the Samsung Electro-Mechanics team. He was part of the Korean national junior team that won the silver medal at the 2004 Asian Junior Championships in the boys' team event, also won the bronze medal in the singles event. At the same year, he also competed at the World Junior Championships, clinched the silver medal in the mixed team event and a bronze medal in the singles event. Hwang represented his country at the 2006 Asian Games, and helped the team win the men's team silver medal. He also claimed the men's singles title at the 2006 Mongolia Satellite tournament.

Achievements

World Junior Championships 
Boys' singles

Asian Junior Championships 
Boys' singles

IBF International 
Men's singles

References

External links 
 

1986 births
Living people
People from Suncheon
South Korean male badminton players
Badminton players at the 2006 Asian Games
Asian Games silver medalists for South Korea
Asian Games medalists in badminton
Medalists at the 2006 Asian Games
Sportspeople from South Jeolla Province
Dong-a University alumni